The Netsilik  (Netsilingmiut) are Inuit who live predominantly in Kugaaruk and Gjoa Haven of the Kitikmeot Region, Nunavut and to a smaller extent in Taloyoak and the north Qikiqtaaluk Region, in Canada. They were, in the early 20th century, among the last northern indigenous peoples to encounter missionaries from the south.

Language
The missionaries introduced a system of written language called Qaniujaaqpait, based on syllabics, to the Netsilik in the 1920s. Eastern Canadian Inuit, among them the Netsilik, were the only Inuit to adopt a syllabic system of writing. The Netsilik's spoken language is Natsilingmiutut.  The Utkuhiksalingmiut, a Caribou Inuit band, speak a variant of it, Utkuhiksalik.

Hunting and fishing

The harsh Arctic environment that the Netsilik inhabited yielded little plant life, so the Netsilik had to rely on hunting to acquire most of the resources they needed to survive. In the summer months, the Netsilik would hunt caribou on the tundra. The caribou provided food as well as the hides most commonly used for clothing, although polar bear skins were also used when caribou skin was unavailable. Caribou antlers were also extremely important, and the Netsilik made many implements from caribou antlers, including the breathing hole probe that was integral for seal hunting. In the winter months the Netsilik would migrate out onto the sea ice where they would fish and hunt seal. The Netsilik people used fish as another subsistence strategy when seal and caribou were not available. The Netsilik fished for Arctic char using a kakivak to impale fish through a hole in the ice. Any excess fish were stored in ice blocks and saved for a time when fishing and hunting were both unrewarding. Seals also provided the Netsilik with fat for their kudlik (soapstone lamps), which both lit and heated the igloos. This made the Netsilik, and most other Inuit, one of the few peoples to hunt for their heating fuel, rather than use wood.

Culture
By 1923, the Netsilik were in possession of firearms, and iron and steel had also begun to replace flint and bone for arrowheads, harpoons, needles, knives and other tools. This made hunting much easier, and the traditional migration patterns of the Netsilik began to change. From the 1930s to the 1960s, Christian missionaries and the Canadian government became more involved in the lives of the Netsilik, who began trading fox pelts in order to generate income to purchase imported goods. The process of acculturation accelerated in the 1960s, with more and more Netsilik converting to Christianity, moving into permanent settlements built from imported materials, taking up wage labour and using government services. Today, the Netsilik essentially do not practice traditional forms of subsistence, although some elders continue to make traditional artifacts such as kayaks and stone tools and trinkets for museums and for sale.

The Netsilik people were the subject of a 1970s U.S. educational project, Man: A Course of Study, which attracted criticism from American conservative groups.
In 1988 excerpts from Knud Rasmussen's Journals of the Fifth Thule Expedition were used by Canadian/American composer Raymond Luedeke to create an orchestral work with narration, Tales of the Netilik. This work was commissioned by six Canadian orchestras and played throughout Canada.

The explorers Knud Rasmussen and Gontran de Poncins reported that senicide was still practiced by the Netsilik of King William's Land as recently as the 1930s.

References

"The Inuktitut Language" in Project Naming, the identification of Inuit portrayed in photographic collections at Library and Archives Canada maddy

Further reading

 
 Balikci, Asen. Cultural Change Among Netsilik Eskimos. Canada House lectures series, no. 19. [London] ([Canada House, Trafalgar Sq., SW1Y 5BJ]): [Canadian High Commission], 1983. 
 
 Cavanagh, Beverley. Music of the Netsilik Eskimo A Study of Stability and Change. Ottawa: National Museums of Canada, 1982. 
 Diamond, Beverley. Music of the Netsilik Eskimo A Study of Stability and Change. Ottawa: National Museums of Canada, 1982. 
 Oosten, J. G. The Theoretical Structure of the Religion of the Netsilik and the Iglulik. [S.l.]: Oosten, 1976. 
 Pollick, Jason. Anguaks in Copper and Netsilik Inuit Spirituality. Ottawa: National Library of Canada = Bibliothèque nationale du Canada, 2004. 
 Rasmussen, Knud, and W. E. Calvert. The Netsilik Eskimos, Social Life and Spiritual Culture. Copenhagen: Gyldendal, 1931. 
 Taylor, J. Garth. Netsilik Eskimo Material Culture. The Roald Amundsen Collection from King William Island. Oslo: Universitetsforlaget, 1974. 
 Thule Expedition, and Knud Rasmussen. The Netsilik Eskimos Social Life and Spiritual Culture. Washington, D.C.: Brookhaven Press, 1978. 
 Wight, Darlene. Art & Expression of the Netsilik. [Winnipeg]: Winnipeg Art Gallery, 2000. 

Central Inuit
Kitikmeot Region
Qikiqtaaluk Region
Indigenous peoples in Northern Canada